Dave Scott (born 1974) is an American hip-hop dance teacher, choreographer, and talent developer. He gained widespread success from his choreography in movies, primarily the 2004 dance film You Got Served and the 2008 dance film Step Up 2: The Streets. He is a resident choreographer on So You Think You Can Dance and The PULSE on Tour dance convention.

Early life
Dave was born and raised in Compton, California. He is 6'4 and has never taken any dance classes or had any formal training. He started dancing as a hobby when he was 15. He learned how to dance from watching musicals, b-boy movies, and music videos, namely those of Michael Jackson whom he cites as one of his influences. He acknowledges hip-hop dance pioneers Stefan "Mr. Wiggles" Clemente and Timothy "Popin' Pete" Solomon as influences as well.

As a teenager, he further developed his skills by forming his own b-boy crew and battling other crews in his neighborhood. After graduating high school, Scott attended Weber State University on a basketball scholarship where he earned an associate's degree in business. He got his first professional dance job while in Utah by chance when he was asked to replace a dancer on a concert tour after being spotted dancing in a club. He later returned to California and started his career by dancing on tours and in music videos.

Career
From tours and music videos, he built relationships in the dance community and moved into teaching classes and doing choreography for film and television. He describes his choreography style as aggressive, melodic, and energetic. He has worked with singers such as Ginuwine, B2K, Tyrese, Brian McKnight, Jon B, IMx, rapper Bow Wow, and Olympic gold medalist Tara Lipinski. He is the choreographer and co-creator of teen R&B group Mindless Behavior.

In 2012, he co-choreographed the Ubisoft video game The Hip Hop Dance Experience with Laurieann Gibson and b-boy David "Kid David" Shreibman. As of May 2013, he is a mentor/judge on Danceamatic.com, a website that host monthly choreography competitions.

Film
In 2001, Scott formed the teen R&B group B2K and served as their choreographer and stylist. With the group he went on to choreograph the movie You Got Served which featured all four singers in primary roles. In 2004, he won an American Choreography Award for Best Choreography in a Feature Film. Following the success of the movie, he released an instructional dance DVD, You Got Served:Take it to the Streets which teaches viewers how to do the dance routines featured in the film. In addition to You Got Served, he co-choreographed Step Up 2: The Streets with Jamal Sims and Nadine "Hi Hat" Ruffin. In 2008, he won a Fred and Adele Astaire Award for Best Choreography in Film.

Scott also choreographed the movies Fresh, Stomp the Yard, Dance Flick, House Party 4, and Coach Carter. In 2010, Scott appeared in the independent documentary MOVE — a film about how people in the dance industry were able to go from dancing as a hobby to dancing as a career. He choreographed the 2013 film Battle of the Year: The Dream Team which is based on the 2007 documentary Planet B-Boy.

Television
In 2003, he was a guest choreographer on The Wade Robson Project. He was also a guest choreographer on Step It Up and Dance and on season seven of Dancing with the Stars. Since season three he has been a recurring hip-hop choreographer on the show So You Think You Can Dance.

Teaching
In conjunction with Debbie Allen Dance Academy, Scott serves as the director of the Los Angeles Hip Hop Intensive. He is a faculty member with PULSE dance convention, Millennium Dance Complex, and Broadway Dance Center.

References

External links

 
 

People from Compton, California
Dance teachers
American choreographers
So You Think You Can Dance choreographers
Participants in American reality television series
1974 births
Living people
African-American choreographers
21st-century African-American people
20th-century African-American people